Edmundo Pisano Valdés (19 May 1919 – 29 March 1997) was a Chilean plant ecologist, botanist and agronomist. Born in Punta Arenas in Chile's far south Pisano studied agronomy at the University of Chile. In the late 1960s he returned to Punta Arenas. Initially he intended to work on in agriculture but eventually he ended up doing research at Instituto de la Patagonia which he founded together with Mateo Martinic and others.

References

20th-century Chilean botanists
Chilean agronomists
Chilean geographers
Chilean phytogeographers
People from Punta Arenas
1919 births
1997 deaths
20th-century geographers
20th-century agronomists